Kolossus is a 2008 album by Keep of Kalessin.

Kolossus may also refer to:
Kolossus, a 2012 novel by Tim Jorgenson featuring an alternative history with Hitler
Kolossus, a giant robot in Mega Shark vs. Kolossus
Kolossus, a character who appeared in the ouija board games of Sylvia Plath and Ted Hughes directing her to write poems in The Colossus and Other Poems
Ensemble Kolossus, a musical ensemble with Michael Formanek

See also
Colossus (disambiguation)
Kolossos Rodou B.C., Greek professional basketball team